The 2009–10 Regionalliga season was the sixteenth since its re-establishment after German reunification and the second as a fourth-level league within the German football league system. It was contested in three divisions with eighteen teams each. The competition began on 7 August 2008 with the first matches of each division and ended on 29 May 2010.

Team changes from 2008–09

Movement between 3. Liga and Regionalliga
The champions of the three 2008–09 Regionalliga divisions were promoted to the 2009–10 3. Liga. These were Holstein Kiel (North), Borussia Dortmund II (West) and 1. FC Heidenheim 1846 (South).

VfR Aalen and Stuttgarter Kickers were relegated from the 2008–09 3. Liga after finishing the season in the bottom two places. 18th-placed Wacker Burghausen were eventually spared from relegation after 5th-placed Kickers Emden voluntarily retracted their application for a license because of financial issues. Since Emden did not apply for a Regionalliga license, they were eventually moved to the fifth-tier Oberliga Niedersachsen.

Movement between Regionalliga and fifth-level leagues
Altona 93, Sachsen Leipzig, Energie Cottbus II (all North), BV Cloppenburg, 1. FC Kleve (both West), TSV Großbardorf and SpVgg Unterhaching II (both South) were relegated at the end of the 2008–09 season. Furthermore, FSV Oggersheim (West) and Viktoria Aschaffenburg (South) withdrew from the league due to financial issues.

The relegated teams were replaced by teams from the fifth-level leagues of the German league pyramid and allocated to one of the three divisions. SC Goslar 08 as winners of a round between the champions of the fifth-level leagues on the territory of the former Oberliga Nord, Tennis Borussia Berlin as NOFV-Oberliga Nord champions and ZFC Meuselwitz as winners of the NOFV-Oberliga Süd joined the Northern division. NRW-Liga champions Bonner SC and  runners-up Fortuna Düsseldorf II, along with Oberliga Südwest champions 1. FC Saarbrücken were included to the Western division. Finally, SG Sonnenhof Großaspach as winners of the Oberliga Baden-Württemberg, SpVgg Weiden as Bayernliga champions and FC Bayern Alzenau as Hessenliga runners-up were added to the Southern division; Alzenau were granted promotion because Hessenliga champions SC Waldgirmes were not able to meet the necessary licensing criteria.

Movement between divisions
In order to achieve a size of eighteen teams for each division, Waldhof Mannheim were moved from the Southern to the Western division for this season.

Regionalliga Nord

League table

Top goalscorers
Final standings; Source: kicker

29 goals
  Daniel Frahn (SV Babelsberg 03)

19 goals
  Mike Könnecke (VfL Wolfsburg II)

16 goals
  Lars Fuchs (1. FC Magdeburg)

15 goals
  Radovan Vujanovic (1. FC Magdeburg)

14 goals
  Kai Zimmermann (VFC Plauen)

13 goals
  Rafael Kazior (Hamburger SV II)
  Jaroslaw Lindner (Hannover 96 II)
  Andreas Richter (Chemnitzer FC)
  Stefan Winkel (FC St. Pauli II)

12 goals
  Sebastian Gasch (ZFC Meuselwitz)
  David Jansen (Chemnitzer FC)
  Stefan Richter (VfB Lübeck)

Regionalliga West

League table

Top goalscorers
Final standings; Source: kicker

16 goals
  Ercan Aydogmus (Bonner SC)
  Christian Knappmann (SC Verl)

14 goals
  Mirkan Aydın (VfL Bochum II)
  Sascha Mölders (Rot-Weiss Essen)

11 goals
  Wojciech Pollok (Preußen Münster)
  Daniel Reule (Waldhof Mannheim)
  Manuel Zeitz (1. FC Saarbrücken)

10 goals
  Christian Erwig (FC Schalke 04 II
  Marcus Fischer (Sportfreunde Lotte)
  Mario Klinger (1. FC Kaiserslautern II)

Regionalliga Süd

League table

Top goalscorers
Final standings; Source: kicker

19 goals
 Abedin Krasniqi (SG Sonnenhof Großaspach)
 Mijo Tunjic (Stuttgarter Kickers)

18 goals
 Martin Hess (Eintracht Frankfurt II)

16 goals
 Peter Heyer (1. FC Eintracht Bamberg)

15 goals
 Ahmet Kulabas (1. FC Nuremberg II)

14 goals
 Yannick Kakoko (SpVgg Greuther Fürth II)

13 goals
 Daniel Caligiuri (SC Freiburg II)
 Michael Schürg (SSV Ulm 1846)

12 goals
 Alban Meha (SSV Reutlingen)
 Mathias Fetsch (TSV 1860 München II)

References

External links
 Regionalliga at the German Football Association 
 Regionalliga Nord 2009–10 at kicker.de
 Regionalliga Süd 2009–10 at kicker.de
 Regionalliga West 2009–10 at kicker.de

Regionalliga seasons
4
German